Dermocystida is an order of parasitic eukaryotes.

Taxonomy
 Family Rhinosporidiaceae Mendoza et al. 2001
 Genus Amphibiocystidium Pascolini et al. 2003
 Genus Chromosphaera Grau-Bové et al. 2017
 Genus Dermocystidium Pérez 1908 [Amphibiothecum Feldman, Wimsatt & Green, 2005; Dermocystis Pérez 1907 non]
 Genus Dermosporidium Carini 1940
 Genus Dermotheca 
 Genus Rhinosporidium Minchin & Fantham 1905
 Genus Sphaerothecum Arkush et al. 2003 (Rosette agent)
 Genus Valentines Borteiro et al. 2018

References 

Mesomycetozoea
Parasitic opisthokonts
Opisthokont orders